Christian August Koenitzer (March 31, 1853 – May 8, 1912) was an American politician and businessman.

Born in Wauwatosa, Milwaukee County, Wisconsin, Koenizner was educated in the public schools. He was in the real estate business, was a livestock dealer, and wholesale meat dealer. Koenitzer owned a saloon in Milwaukee, Wisconsin. From 1891 to 1895, Koenitzer served in the Wisconsin State Senate and was a Democrat. Koenitzer committed suicide with a firearm in the back room of his saloon in Milwaukee, Wisconsin. Koenitzer was charged in district court for a statutory offense.

Notes

1853 births
1912 suicides
Politicians from Milwaukee
People from Wauwatosa, Wisconsin
Businesspeople from Wisconsin
Democratic Party Wisconsin state senators
Suicides by firearm in Wisconsin
American politicians who committed suicide
19th-century American politicians
19th-century American businesspeople